César Franco Lobos Asman (born 22 February 1999) is a Chilean footballer who currently plays for Universidad de Chile as a forward.

Career statistics

Club

External links
 
 

Living people
1999 births
Chilean footballers
Chilean Primera División players
Segunda División B players
Universidad de Chile footballers
Celta de Vigo B players
Unión La Calera footballers
Chilean expatriate footballers
Chilean expatriate sportspeople in Spain
Expatriate footballers in Spain
Association football forwards